Øystein Jarlsbo (born 7 March 1961) is a former Norwegian ice hockey player. He was born in Oslo, Norway. He played for the Norwegian national ice hockey team at the 1980 and 1984 Winter Olympics.

References

External links
 

1961 births
Ice hockey players at the 1980 Winter Olympics
Ice hockey players at the 1984 Winter Olympics
Living people
Norwegian ice hockey players
Olympic ice hockey players of Norway
Ice hockey people from Oslo